Kelvin Jerome Kight (born July 2, 1982) is an American former college and professional football player who was a wide receiver in the National Football League (NFL) for 4 seasons during the early 2000s.  Kight played college football for the University of Florida, and thereafter, he played professionally for the Green Bay Packer and New England Patriots of the NFL.

Early years 

Kight was born in Atlanta, Georgia.  He attended Lithonia High School in Lithonia, Georgia, and played high school football for the Lithonia Bulldogs.

College career 

Kight accepted an athletic scholarship to attend the University of Florida in Gainesville, Florida, where he played for coach Steve Spurrier and coach Ron Zook's Florida Gators football teams from 2000 to 2003.  Memorably, he caught six passes for 132 yards against the Florida State Seminoles in 2002.  As a senior in 2003, he led the Gators with thirty-nine receptions for a total of 591 yards.

Professional career 

Over his career, he has also been a member of the Green Bay Packers, the Jacksonville Jaguars, and the Minnesota Vikings. In Week 16 of the 2006 season, versus the Jacksonville Jaguars, Kight caught his first career catch on the first play of the game for the Patriots. He was waived by the team on September 1, 2007.

See also 

 List of Green Bay Packers players

References 

1982 births
Living people
American football wide receivers
Florida Gators football players
Green Bay Packers players
Jacksonville Jaguars players
Minnesota Vikings players
New England Patriots players
Players of American football from Atlanta
St. Louis Rams players